Dowtujahan (also Romanized as Dowtūjahān; also known as Dotūjahān) is a village in Jaydasht Rural District, in the Central District of Firuzabad County, Fars Province, Iran. At the 2006 census, its population was 90, in 15 families.

References 

Populated places in Firuzabad County